Saint-Triphon is a village and a Swiss heritage site of national significance in the municipality of Ollon in the canton of Vaud in Switzerland.

References

External links

Cultural property of national significance in the canton of Vaud